Strawberry pseudo mild yellow-edge virus (SPMYEV) is a pathogenic plant virus.

See also 
 List of strawberry diseases

References

External links 
 ICTVdB - The Universal Virus Database: Strawberry pseudo mild yellow-edge virus
 Family Groups - The Baltimore Method

Carlaviruses
Viral strawberry diseases